Angelo Colaco (born 23 January 1989) is an Indian footballer who plays as a midfielder for Vasco S.C. in the I-League 2nd Division.

Career

Vasco
Colaco has played in the Federation Cup and I-League for Vasco.

References

Indian footballers
1989 births
Living people
I-League players
Association football midfielders
Footballers from Goa